Walter Johnston may refer to:

Walter E. Johnston III (1936–2018), American politician
Walter Woods Johnston (1839–1907), New Zealand politician
Walter Ian Johnston (doctor) (1930–2001), Australian obstetrician
Walter Johnston (footballer) (1884–1946), Australian footballer
Walter Johnston, High Sheriff of Fermanagh

See also
Walter Johnson (disambiguation)